Spring Tonic is a 1935 American comedy film adapted from the play by Ben Hecht and Charles MacArthur. It was directed by Clyde Bruckman and stars Lew Ayres, Claire Trevor, Walter Woolf King, Jack Haley, ZaSu Pitts and Tala Birell. It was released on April 19, 1935, by Fox Film Corporation.

Plot

Cast

References

External links 
 
 
 

1935 films
Fox Film films
American comedy films
1935 comedy films
Films directed by Clyde Bruckman
American black-and-white films
1930s English-language films
1930s American films